The Mikhail Kalinin-class passenger ship (project 101, in Germany known as Seefa 340) is a class of Soviet ocean liners and cruise ships, operated by the Baltic State Shipping Company (BGMP), Far East Shipping Company (FESCO) and Black Sea Shipping Company (ChMMP or BLASCO). 
The 19 Soviet ships of this class were constructed in 1958–1964 by the East German company VEB Mathias-Thesen Werft, in Wismar. The class was named after the first ship in the class Mikhail Kalinin, which in her turn was named after the nominal head of state of Russia and later of the Soviet Union Mikhail Kalinin.

Ocean liners/cruise ships of the project 101/Seefa 340

Overview
Since we couldn't fit information about the vessels in the class, we decided to show 8 out of the 19 vessels in the fleet.

See also
 List of cruise ships

References

External links

 Тип Михаил Калинин, проект (ГДР) 

Ocean liner classes
Ships built in East Germany
Passenger ships of the Soviet Union
East Germany–Soviet Union relations
Ships built in Wismar